Thomas Francis Wilson Jr. (born April 15, 1959) is an American actor and comedian. He is best known for playing Biff Tannen, Griff Tannen, and Buford "Mad Dog" Tannen in the Back to the Future film trilogy (1985–1990). He also played coach Ben Fredricks in the comedy series Freaks and Geeks (1999–2000) and voices various characters, mainly villains,  on the Nickelodeon animated series SpongeBob SquarePants (2001–present).

Early life
Thomas Francis Wilson Jr. was born in Philadelphia on April 15, 1959, and grew up in nearby Wayne. While attending Radnor High School, he was involved in dramatic arts, served as president of the debate team (where his partner was future New York Times columnist David Brooks), played the tuba in the high school band, and was the drum major of the school marching band. He studied international politics at Arizona State University and attended the American Academy of Dramatic Arts in New York City. In 1979, he got his first significant stage experience as a comedian.

Career
In 1981, Wilson moved to Los Angeles to pursue his acting career. He shared an apartment with fellow aspiring comedians Andrew Dice Clay and Yakov Smirnoff, and later joked that he "taught them both about America". He had a small role in the second season of NBC's Knight Rider in an episode titled "A Knight In Shining Armor".

Wilson's breakthrough role was as the bully Biff Tannen in the 1985 film Back to the Future. He returned in the sequels Back to the Future Part II and Back to the Future Part III to not only reprise his role as Biff, but to also play Biff's grandson Griff Tannen and great-grandfather Buford "Mad Dog" Tannen. In each Back to the Future film, his character ends up in a pile of manure after trying to kill or hurt Michael J. Fox's character Marty McFly. He reprised his role as Biff and voiced various Tannen relatives in the animated series.  Wilson did not reprise his role as Biff in the initial versions of Telltale's Back to the Future: The Game released in 2011, being replaced by Kid Beyond. When the game was ported to the PlayStation 4, Xbox 360 and Xbox One in 2015 in commemoration of the original film's 30th anniversary, Wilson returned to provide Biff's voice in these newer versions.

In 1992, he voiced gangster Tony Zucco in Batman: The Animated Series and police detective Matt Bluestone in the animated series Gargoyles. He later went to co-star with Mark Hamill in the video game Wing Commander III: Heart of the Tiger. It was the third chapter in the Wing Commander series, but the first to feature live action and was extremely popular at the time. The character played by Wilson was Major Todd "Maniac" Marshall, a fellow starfighter pilot to Hamill's character. Wilson also starred in the sequels Wing Commander IV: The Price of Freedom (1995) and Wing Commander: Prophecy (1997) and contributed his voice to the animated series Wing Commander Academy (1996) in the same role. He also guest starred in an episode of Lois and Clark: The New Adventures of Superman in 1997.

Wilson played McKinley High School's Coach Ben Fredricks in the 1999–2000 NBC comedy drama Freaks and Geeks. In 1994, Wilson was briefly reunited with his Back to the Future co-star Christopher Lloyd in the film Camp Nowhere.

Wilson has done voice-over work for the Nickelodeon television series SpongeBob SquarePants. He has voiced many villainous characters that are physically strong and menacing, such as Flats the Flounder in the third-season episode "The Bully", The Tattletale Strangler in "SpongeBob Meets the Strangler", and the non-villainous character Reg the Club Bouncer in "No Weenies Allowed". In 2005, he played Coach Phelps in the TV series Zoey 101.

In 2009, he released his very first stand-up comedy special and second comedy album, Tom Wilson: Bigger Than You.

He hosted a podcast, Big Pop Fun, on the Nerdist Network from 2011 to 2014. The podcast featured Tom sharing stories of his career, as well as informal chats with show business friends including Samm Levine, Blake Clark, Steve Oedekerk and "Weird Al" Yankovic.

Wilson currently maintains a YouTube channel, where he regularly vlogs. As of March 2023, his channel has over 36,100 subscribers.

Personal life
Wilson married Caroline Thomas on July 6, 1985. They have four children, and live in Los Angeles, California.

Wilson is a devout Catholic and released a contemporary Christian album in 2000 called In the Name of the Father. He is also a painter in his spare time, and many of his paintings focus on classic children's toys. In 2006, he was selected to join the California Featured Artist Series at Disneyland.

With the rise in popularity of the Back to the Future series, many people began to ask Wilson questions about his experiences making the films. He found the repetitive nature of the questions to be both hilarious and frustrating, and wrote a song about them titled "Biff's Question Song" which he includes in his stand-up routine.

Filmography

Film

Television

Video games

Theme parks

Discography
Tom Wilson is Funny! (2005)
Tom Wilson: Bigger Than You (2009)

Crew work

Books
  Self published.

References

External links

 
 
 
 Konbini - Interview (2016) 

1959 births
Living people
American male comedians
American male film actors
American male television actors
American male video game actors
American male voice actors
American podcasters
American Roman Catholics
Arizona State University alumni
Male actors from Philadelphia
People from Radnor Township, Pennsylvania
20th-century American comedians
21st-century American comedians
20th-century American male actors
21st-century American male actors